ESSA-7 (or TOS-E) was a spin-stabilized operational meteorological satellite. Its name was derived from that of its oversight agency, the Environmental Science Services Administration (ESSA).

Launch 
ESSA-7 was launched on August 16, 1968, at 11:31 UTC. It was launched atop a Delta rocket from Vandenberg Air Force Base, California, USA. ESSA-7 had an inclination of 101.72°, and an orbited the earth once every 114.9 minutes.

References

Spacecraft launched in 1968
Weather satellites of the United States